Ralph Earl (May 11, 1751 – August 16, 1801) was an American painter known for his portraits, of which at least 183 can be documented. He also painted six landscapes, including a panorama display of Niagara Falls.

Early life 
Ralph Earl was born on May 11, 1751 in either Shrewsbury or Leicester, Massachusetts, the oldest of four children of Ralph Earle and Phebe Whittemore Earl. By 1774, he was working in New Haven, Connecticut as a portrait painter.  In the autumn of 1774, Earl returned to Leicester, Massachusetts to marry his cousin, Sarah Gates. A few months later, their daughter Phebe was born in January 1775.  Earl left them both with Sarah's parents and returned to New Haven to continue painting portraits.  Earl's wife and daughter joined him in New Haven in November 1776, and they lived there until May 1777, when their son, John, was born. Sarah later attested that this six-month period "was all the time we kept house together."

Career
Like many of the colonial craftsmen, Earl was self-taught, and for many years was an itinerant painter. In 1775, Earl visited Lexington and Concord, which were the sites of recent battles in the American Revolution. Although his father was a colonel in the Revolutionary army, Earl himself was a Loyalist. Working in collaboration with the engraver Amos Doolittle, Earl drew four battle scenes that were made into pro-Revolutionary propaganda prints.

In 1778, he left behind his wife and daughter and escaped to England by disguising himself as the servant of British army captain John Money.

In London, he entered the studio of Benjamin West, and painted the king and many notables. Earl continued painting portraits in the town of Norwich.  He later married Ann Whiteside, an English woman, despite the fact that he had never ended his marriage with Sarah Gates. In 1785 or 1786, Earl returned to the United States with his new wife.

Return to America
After his return to America, he made portraits of Timothy Dwight, Governor Caleb Strong, Roger Sherman, and other prominent men. He also painted a large picture of Niagara Falls.  In September 1786, while living in New York City, Earl was imprisoned for failing to pay his personal debts. Even while in jail, he drew portraits of his visitors, friends, and family of the Society for the Relief of Distressed Debtors. He was released in January 1788.

Personal life
Earl probably trained his son, painter Ralph Eleaser Whiteside Earl, and was an influence on his nephew Augustus Earle who is reputed to have been the first European artist to have visited all five continents. Ralph's brother James Earl (1761–1796) was also a portrait painter.

He died in Bolton, Connecticut, on August 16, 1801, at age 50. Alcoholism is believed to be the main cause of death.

Influence
Earl was also an influence on John Brewster, Jr.

Gallery

References

External links 

 Portrait of Roger Sherman,  1775 (age 24): Earl-PortraitRSherman.
 "Early American Paintings" (biography), Worcester Art, 2005, webpage: WorcArt-EarlR.
Union List of Artist Names, Getty Vocabularies. ULAN Full Record Display for Ralph Earl. Getty Vocabulary Program, Getty Research Institute. Los Angeles, California.
 "Early American Paintings" (biography), Worcester Art, 2005, webpage: WorcArt-EarlR.

1751 births
1801 deaths
18th-century American painters
18th-century American male artists
American male painters
People from Leicester, Massachusetts
Artists from Massachusetts
American portrait painters
Artists from New Haven, Connecticut
People imprisoned for debt